Strai is a village and a district in the municipality of Kristiansand in Agder, Norway. It is located in the borough of Grim. Its population (2014) is about 1,000. The district of Mosby lies to the north, the districts of Lund, Kvadraturen, and Grim are located to the south, and the Songdalen area lies to the west.

The village of Strai lies on the west shore of the river Otra in the Torridal valley. The village of Mosby lies just to the north along the Norwegian National Road 9. Torridal Church is located just on the northern edge of Strai.

References

Villages in Agder
Populated places in Agder
Geography of Kristiansand
Boroughs of Kristiansand